Turpie is a surname. Notable people with the surname include:

Craig Turpie
David Turpie (1828-1909), American politician
Harry Turpie (1875-1945), Scottish-American professional golf player
Ian Turpie (1943-2012), Australian actor
Jonnie Turpie, British film producer
Stuart Turpie 1948-2015, British basketball player.

See also
Turpie Rock, a rock formation of Antarctica